Broadway railway station is a railway station on the heritage Gloucestershire Warwickshire Railway in the town of Broadway in Worcestershire, England.

History
The original station opened in 1904, and closed to passengers in 1960; the original station buildings was demolished in Autumn 1963 although the line through the site remained open for regular passenger trains until 1968 and goods until official closure in November 1976.

Stationmasters
George James Fifield 1904 - ca. 1920
Sidney James Prothero  1928 - 1935
William Barber 1935 - 1942 (afterwards station master at Stoke Edith)
E.T. Rose 1942 - 1944 (formerly station master at Bewdley, afterwards station master at Shipston-under-Wychwood)
W.L. Mann 1944 - 1945
W.S.B.M. Allen 1945 - 1950
W.H. Jennings from 1950

Preservation 
The GWR Broadway Area Group of the Gloucestershire Warwickshire Railway Trust started work clearing the derelict site in 2009. As of January 2023, both platforms had been reconstructed, a signal box on platform 2 had been rebuilt and has been fitted out with the necessary signalling equipment, the footbridge span and steps (from Henley-in-Arden railway station) have been erected and the main station building had been completed with toilets, a booking office and refreshment room. The station canopy and roof including a further canopy section at the north end to connect with the footbridge was completed in 2022. Platform 2 is not yet open to the public however work to rebuild the original waiting room is progressing.  The rebuilding of Broadway station was largely completed in 2017.

The four mile section of track from Toddington towards Broadway station was relaid from 2015 to 2018. Fund raising included a 2016 share offer, "Broadway: the last mile", to complete the last mile of track. Track-laying commenced in the cutting north of the station during summer 2017 and was completed by year end. Until March 2018 trains had run as far as Laverton Halt and from May 2017 onwards to Little Buckland until the first train since 1960 arrived at Broadway Station on Christmas Eve 2017 after volunteers had finished laying the track on 23 December 2017, an English Electric Class 20 and Electro Diesel Class 73 pulling in the first works train.

The first test steam train was hauled by 7903 'Foremarke Hall' on 9 March 2018 and the first passenger train (for volunteers) was, on 21 March 2018, hauled by 35006 'Peninsular & Oriental S. N. Co.'; public passenger services began on 30 March 2018. At the end of May 2018 the Gloucestershire Warwickshire Railway saw an increase in overall passenger numbers of over 14,000 passengers compared to the previous May, primarily due to the opening of the station at Broadway. The Station and line closed at the beginning of the Covid-19 pandemic but reopened in the Summer of 2020. The Station was closed during this time to passengers wishing to start their journey at Broadway. Full Service was restored in March 2021. 

{
  "type": "FeatureCollection",
  "features": [
    {
      "type": "Feature",
      "properties": {},
      "geometry": {
        "type": "Point",
        "coordinates": [
          -1.8723106384277346,
          52.04320011358952
        ]
      }
    }
  ]
}

References

External links

Railway station website
Steaming to Broadway! - Blog covering the start of the restoration project
Broadway Station Rebuild - Blog covering the later stages of the rebuild
Gloucestershire Warwickshire Railway - GWSR main website

Railway stations in Great Britain opened in 1904
Railway stations in Great Britain closed in 1960
Railway stations in Great Britain opened in 2018
Former Great Western Railway stations
Disused railway stations in Worcestershire